Mourad Berrefane (born March 18, 1986 in Tizi Ouzou) is an Algerian footballer. He currently plays as a goalkeeper for RC Relizane in the Algerian Ligue Professionnelle 2.

Club career
 1998-1999 NRB Beni Douala 
 1999-2011 JS Kabylie 
 2011-pres. MC El Eulma

Honours

Club
 USM Alger
 Algerian Ligue Professionnelle 1 (2): 2015-16, 2018–19
 Algerian Super Cup (1): 2016

 JS Kabylie
 Algerian Ligue Professionnelle 1 (1): 2007-08
 Algerian Cup (1): 2011
 Won the World Military Cup once with the Algerian National Military Team in 2011

References

External links
 JS Kabylie Profile
 DZFoot Profile

1986 births
Algerian footballers
Algerian Ligue Professionnelle 1 players
Algeria youth international footballers
Algeria under-23 international footballers
Living people
Kabyle people
JS Kabylie players
MC El Eulma players
Footballers from Tizi Ouzou
Association football goalkeepers
21st-century Algerian people